Arlindo Manuel Limede de Oliveira, born in Negage, Angola, is a Portuguese academic, researcher and writer. He is author of more than 150 scientific articles and papers in conferences and of three books: The Digital Mind, published by MIT Press and IST Press, Computer Architecture, published by World Scientific and by IST Press and Inteligência Artificial, published by Fundação Francisco Manuel dos Santos.

Arlindo Oliveira obtained his engineering degree from Instituto Superior Técnico - University of Lisbon and his PhD degree from the University of California, Berkeley. He is a senior member of the IEEE and of the Portuguese Academy of Engineering, a notable alumnus of the University of Lisbon and, between 2015 and 2018, the Head of the Portuguese node of ELIXIR. He has been director of INESC-ID between 2000 and 2009, and president of Instituto Superior Técnico between January 2012 and December 2019.

Bibliography 

 Author

2019 - Inteligência artificial, Lisboa: Fundação Francisco Manuel dos Santos,  

2018 - Mentes digitais, a ciência redefinindo a humanidade, Lisboa, IST Press,    

 Co-author

2014 - Arquitectura de computadores: dos sistemas digitais aos microprocessadores; Guilherme Arroz, José Monteiro, Arlindo Oliveira, Lisboa, IST Press -   

 Author of preface

2016 - Manuel Abreu Faro: a criar as bases para a ciência em Portugal / Instituto Superior Técnico; pref. Arlindo Oliveira; introd. Isabel Trancoso; textos Carlos Salema; colab. António Armando da Costa, Lisboa, Althum.com,

References

Computer scientists
1963 births
Living people